Mauro Bernardi (born 11 August 1957) is an Italian former alpine skier who competed in the 1980 Winter Olympics. He closed 10th in overall in 1978 Alpine Skiing World Cup.

World Cup podiums

See also
 Italian skiers who closed in top 10 in overall World Cup

References

External links
  
 
 
 

1957 births
Living people
Italian male alpine skiers
Olympic alpine skiers of Italy
Alpine skiers at the 1980 Winter Olympics
Italian mountain climbers